Jorge Valsassina Galveias (born 6 April 1952) is a Portuguese politician of the Chega party who is a member of the Assembly of the Republic for the Aveiro constituency.

Biography
Galveias was born in 1952. He worked as a management director for an advertisement company for several years before founding a travel and tourism business called  Lisbon Holidays which he managed until 2019.

He was a municipal coordinator in the Centro for Chega and is currently chairman of the party's Congressional table. Galveias is also considered close to party leader Andre Ventura. During the 2022 Portuguese legislative election, he was elected to the Assembly of the Republic for the Aveiro district constituency. In parliament, he sits on the committees for Culture, Communication, Youth and Sports.

References

1952 births
Portuguese politicians
21st-century Portuguese politicians
Chega politicians
Members of the Assembly of the Republic (Portugal)
Living people